Obesotoma hokkaidoensis is a species of sea snail, a marine gastropod mollusk in the family Mangeliidae.

Description
The length of the shell varies between 6.5 mm and 11.5 m.

Distribution
This is a rare marine species occurring in low-boreal waters off Japan at depths between 167 m and 1600 m.

References

 Bartsch, P. (1941) The nomenclatorial status of certain northern turritid mollusks. Proceedings of the Biological Society of Washington, 54: 1–14.
 Hasegawa, K., Okutani, T. and E. Tsuchida (2000) Family Turridae. In: Okutani, T. (ed.), Marine Mollusks in Japan. Tokai University Press, Tokyo, 619–667 (in Japanese).

External links
 Gulbin, Vladimir V. "Review of the Shell-bearing Gastropods in the Russian Waters of the East Sea (Sea of Japan). III. Caenogastropoda: Neogastropoda." The Korean Journal of Malacology 25.1 (2009): 51–70
  Tucker, J.K. 2004 Catalog of recent and fossil turrids (Mollusca: Gastropoda). Zootaxa 682:1–1295.
 
 Biolib.cz: Obesotoma hokkaidoensis

hokkaidoensis
Gastropods described in 1941